India–Turkey relations, also called Indian-Turkish relations or Indo-Turkish relations are the bilateral relations between India and Turkey. Since the establishment of diplomatic relations between India and Turkey in 1948, political and bilateral relations have been usually characterised by warmth and cordiality, although some sporadic tensions remain due to Turkey's support for Pakistan, India's rival. India has an embassy in Ankara and a consulate–general in Istanbul. Turkey has an embassy in New Delhi and also a consulate-general in Mumbai. As of 2015, the bilateral trade between India and Turkey stood at US$6.26 billion.

History
In 1212, the Seljuk Sultanate of Rum was gifted a colony in Koothanallur from the Chola Emperor of Tamilakam. The first exchange of diplomatic missions between the Ottoman Sultans and the Muslim rulers of the sub-continent dates back to the years 1481–82. Ottoman expeditions to the sultanates of Gujarat, Bijapur, and Ahmednagar were motivated by mutual anti-Portuguese sentiment; Ottoman artillery contributed to the fall of the pro-Portuguese Vijayanagara Empire. Turkish-Indian relations soured when the Mughals conquered most of India, since the Mughal Empire was a symbolic threat to the Ottoman Empire's position as the universal caliphate, despite contemplation for a Mughal-Ottoman-Uzbek alliance against Iran. After the Mughal Empire collapsed, Muslim rulers of Mysore like Tipu Sultan sought Ottoman aid in driving out the British, but the Ottomans were weakened by wars with Russia and in no position to help.

Economic and cultural relations between ancient India and Anatolia date back to the Vedic age (before 1500 BCE). India and Turkey also have a cultural overlap. A strong historical connection between Indian Muslims and
Turkey exists dating back to the medieval era and fostered with the late 19th and 20th century interaction between the two. There are also over 9,000 words common in Hindi and Turkish languages. More recent historical contacts between India and Turkey were reflected in the medical mission led by renowned Indian freedom fighter, Dr. M. A. Ansari, to Turkey in 1912 during the Balkan Wars. During World War I, the British Raj played a pivotal role in the successful Allied campaign against the Ottoman Empire.
There are deep historical connections between India and Turkey. However, India also extended support in the 1920s to Turkey's War of Independence and the formation of the Turkish republic. Mahatma Gandhi himself took a stand against the injustices inflicted on Turkey at the end of World War I.

Turkey recognised India right after its declaration of independence on 15 August 1947 and diplomatic relations were established between the two countries. As Turkey was part of the Western Alliance and India of the Non-Aligned Movement during the Cold War era, the bilateral relations did not develop at a desired pace. However, since the end of the Cold War era, both sides put in effort in developing their bilateral relations in every field. In contemporary times, relations between India and Turkey have been strained due to Turkey's religious mutuality with Pakistan. Until recently, Turkey was a vocal advocate of Pakistan's position on the Kashmir dispute. Turkey was also one of the few opponents to India's inclusion into the Nuclear Suppliers Group. India's GMR Group is one of the main stakeholders in the new Sabiha Gökçen International Airport in İstanbul. Both the countries are members of the G20 group of major economies, where the two countries have closely cooperated on the management of the world economy. Bilateral trade in July 2012 stood at US$7.5 billion, a figure that is expected to double to US$15 billion by 2015. Strategically too, there are growing areas of consensus. On Afghanistan, Turkey had taken the lead in 2011 to begin the Istanbul Process to find meaningful and sustainable solutions to Afghanistan's problems. The Istanbul Process culminated in the annual "Heart of Asia" regional conference on Afghanistan held in Kazakhstan's former capital, Almaty, with both India and Turkey playing important roles. In the context of the planned 2014 withdrawal of NATO and US troops from Afghanistan, the need for Delhi and Ankara to intensify dialogue over Afghanistan has acquired a particular importance.

In September 2019, Turkey had criticized India on the issue of Jammu and Kashmir and the revocation of article 370. It made vocal comments against India at the United Nations. Thereby it favoured the position of Pakistan in this respect. Due to this the relationship between India and Turkey are strained.

India condemned Turkey for its military offensive into north-eastern Syria, claiming it would undermine regional stability and the fight against terrorism. India also called upon Turkey to exercise restraint and respect the sovereignty and territorial integrity of Syria.

On 24 December 2020, Turkish authorities shutdown a website which according to Pakistani officials, was operated by India and used propaganda against Pakistan.

Turkey has repeatedly condemned attacks on Indian forces by Naxalites during the Naxalite–Maoist insurgency, which India has claimed have links to groups involved in the Maoist insurgency in Turkey.

Bilateral trade relations

The bilateral trade relations started its new phase and both sides emphasised the importance of developing bilateral cooperation programmes with the aim to enhance their commercial relations on a mutually beneficial and sustainable basis. However, as the world's second-most populous country, India's progress in gaining importance in the global economy and international politics since the 1990s has led to Turkey's quest to develop a new strategy for South Asia. Turkey has also begun to prioritise India in South Asian politics while preserving its traditionally good relations with Pakistan and Bangladesh. In recent years, the relations between the two countries have warmed due to common strategic goals, and there is a growing bilateral cooperation in the fields of education, technology and commerce.

On 18 March 2012, Burak Akçapar, Ambassador of the Republic of Turkey in India, announced that Turkey sought to double flights from India and open four more connecting points. Other destinations considered are Hyderabad, Chennai, Kolkata and Bengaluru. At present, Turkish Airlines operates daily flights from Mumbai and New Delhi to Istanbul. A joint study on a free trade area was conducted, but is yet to be signed. He also announced that consulates in Chennai and Hyderabad, in South India, are planned to be started, as permission had been gained from the Indian government.

Investments
More than 150 companies with Indian capital have registered businesses in Turkey in the form of joint-ventures, trade and representative offices. These include M/s Polyplex, GMR Infrastructure, TATA Motors, Mahindra & Mahindra, Reliance, Ispat, Aditya Birla Group, Tractors and Farm Equipment Ltd, Jain Irrigation, Wipro , Sequent Scientific and Dabur. Turkey ranks 41st overall in terms of FDI inflows to India. Cumulative Turkish direct investment into India amounts to US$ 87.18 million (April 2000 – April 2014).

Cooperation in Space Technology
Turkey's first nano satellite "ITUpSAT1", manufactured at the Istanbul Technical University's Faculty of Aeronautics was sent to space on a PSLV C-14 rocket by the Indian Space Research Organisation (ISRO) on 23 September 2009. The satellite orbited the earth at an altitude of 720 kilometres and had the capacity to take continental photos. Its orbital life was six months. Turkey is keen to expand cooperation in space technology with India.

Defence cooperation

During the visit of Prime Minister Turgut Ozal to India in 1986, it was agreed that the two embassies will house Defence Attaché office. During the visit of Prime Minister Vajpayee in September 2003, it was decided that Defence Ministers of both countries should remain in closer touch. India conveyed its willingness to expand military to military contacts, and mutual exchange of delegations to training facilities. During the visit of the Turkish Prime Minister Erdoğan to India in November 2008, both prime ministers agreed to enhance cooperation between the two defence forces. As far as the military exercises between India and Turkey is concerned, there has been a regular but a low profile passage exercises (PASSEX) between the Navies of the two countries.

See also
 Indians in Turkey
 Turkic peoples in India
 Foreign relations of India
 Foreign relations of Turkey

References

Other sources
 Mehmet Ozkan, Can the Rise of 'New' Turkey Lead to a 'New' Era in India-Turkey Relations?, IDSA Issue Brief, September 2010 (PDF).

External links
 Embassy of India in Turkey
 Embassy of Turkey in India
 Consulate of Turkey in Mumbai

 
Turkey
Bilateral relations of Turkey